Phil Bogle (born September 27, 1979) is a former American football guard and assistant head coach and general manager for the Philadelphia Soul of the Arena Football League. He was signed by the San Diego Chargers as an undrafted free agent in 2003. He played college football at New Haven.

Bogle was also a member of the Cleveland Browns, Philadelphia Soul, Tampa Bay Buccaneers, Philadelphia Soul, Montreal Alouettes, Dallas Vigilantes and Florida Tuskers.

Early years
Bogle attended Spring Valley High School in Spring Valley, New York where he was an All-State, All-Section and All-League selection in football. Bogle also became the fourth person from Spring Valley High School to make it to the NFL after Seth Joyner, John Harvey and R-Kal Truluck.

College career
Bogle attended the University of New Haven from 1999 to 2002, starting every game for the team at offensive tackle during his career. A team captain during his final two seasons, he was a First-team Division II All-Independent selection as a senior in 2002 and winner the Jim Langer Award. He was also the 2002 Cactus Bowl MVP and 2003 New Haven Male Athlete of the Year.

Professional career

San Diego Chargers
After going undrafted in the 2003 NFL Draft, Bogle was signed by the San Diego Chargers as an undrafted free agent on April 23. During his rookie season, Bogle worked at both guard and tackle and started 13 of the 16 games in which he appeared. Bogle also recorded three tackles on the year. That season, Chargers running back LaDainian Tomlinson rushed for more than 1,600 yards.

During the 2004 offseason, Bogle received an extra $74,754 from the league's performance-based pay program. After dealing with a knee injury in the spring, Bogle failed to make the Chargers' roster in September and was released. He was re-signed to the active roster from the practice squad after offensive tackle Courtney Van Buren was placed on injured reserve with a knee injury. Bogle was released by the team again on October 4.

Cleveland Browns
After spending the remainder of the 2004 season out of football, Bogle signed with the Cleveland Browns on February 15, 2005. However, he was waived by the team on July 29.

First stint with Buccaneers
Following his release from the Browns, Bogle was signed by the Tampa Bay Buccaneers on August 16, 2005. He was released by the team on August 30 and was out of football until being re-signed by the Buccaneers on January 11, 2006. Bogle's two-year contract contained base salaries of $310,000 in 2006 and $385,000 in 2007. That same month, Bogle was drafted by the Hamburg Sea Devils of NFL Europe. The Buccaneers waived Bogle again on July 28, 2006.

First stint with Soul
On October 27, 2006, Bogle was signed by the Philadelphia Soul of the Arena Football League.

During his rookie season in 2007, Bogle started all 16 regular season games and two postseason games for the Soul on his way to becoming the franchise's first player to be named to the All-Rookie Team and First-team All-Arena in the same season.

In 2008, Bogle earned his second consecutive First-team All-Arena selection and was a finalist for the league's Lineman of the Year award. He appeared in 16 regular season games and three postseason games as the team won ArenaBowl XXII. He caught seven passes for 60 yards and six touchdowns on the season as an eligible-receiver lineman.

Second stint with Buccaneers
Following the 2008 AFL season, Bogle was placed on the Other league exempt list after being re-signed by the Tampa Bay Buccaneers on August 20.

On August 20, 2008, Bogle was re-signed by the Buccaneers to improve the team's offensive line depth. Fullback J. D. Runnels was waived to make room for Bogle on the 80-man roster. However, Bogle was waived by the Buccaneers on August 30.

Second stint with Soul
On September 22, the Philadelphia Soul activated Bogle off the Exempt: Other league list, after he was waived by the Tampa Bay Buccaneers.

Montreal Alouettes
On February 18, 2009, the Montreal Alouettes signed Bogle to a one-year deal with an option for a second year. He was released on June 16, 2009.

Dallas Vigilantes
Bogle signed with the Dallas Vigilantes on January 8, 2010.

Personal
Bogle is the son of Glen Bogle. He has one brother named Conroy and four sisters named Keesha, Shannon, Yolanda and Julisha. During the offseason, he resides in Port St. Lucie, Florida.

See also
 List of Arena Football League and National Football League players

References

External links

Montreal Alouettes bio
Philadelphia Soul bio
Tampa Bay Buccaneers bio

1979 births
Living people
Players of American football from New York (state)
American football offensive tackles
American football offensive guards
African-American players of American football
African-American players of Canadian football
New Haven Chargers football players
San Diego Chargers players
Cleveland Browns players
Tampa Bay Buccaneers players
Hamburg Sea Devils players
Philadelphia Soul players
Montreal Alouettes players
Dallas Vigilantes players
Florida Tuskers players
People from Spring Valley, New York
Philadelphia Soul coaches
21st-century African-American sportspeople
20th-century African-American sportspeople